The Scottish Global Forum is a Scottish think tank which aims to analyse global issues affecting Scotland and its role in the world. The focus is on areas relevant to Scottish public policy and legislation - "Scotland’s domestic politics, economics and security, and also its relations with other states, sub-state actors and international institutions" - but also to inform the general public.

Notable Fellows and advisory board members

 Alyson Bailes - Adjunct Professor, University of Iceland; former UK ambassador to Finland
 Colin Fleming - Research Fellow, University of Edinburgh
 David Hayman - Actor, director, social campaigner
 Christian Kaunert - Director of European Institute for Security and Justice, University of Dundee
 Sarah Léonard - Senior Lecturer in Politics, University of Dundee
 Norrie MacQueen - Honorary Research Fellow, University of St Andrews
 Andrew Parrott - Lt Col (retd), British Army
 David Pratt - Foreign Editor, Sunday Herald
 Brandon Valeriano - Senior Lecturer in Global Security, University of Glasgow
 William Walker - Professor Emeritus of International Relations, University of St Andrews

References

Foreign relations of Scotland
Think tanks based in Scotland
2013 establishments in Scotland
2013 in British politics
Organizations established in 2013
Political and economic think tanks based in the United Kingdom
Foreign policy and strategy think tanks based in the United Kingdom